The New Myanmar Foundation (acronym: NMF) is a Civil society organisation foundation in Myanmar. It was established in January 2008. The foundation focuses on a wide range of civil society development, election education and observation, civic engagement in political process, other education and training. The foundation's motto is "Building a strong Foundation for our society".

NMF observed the 2010 Myanmar election and issued an observation report about the election. They also monitored the 2012 Myanmar by-election. NMF participated in international election education initiatives and observation organisations in Myanmar as well as being a regional observer in Asia. New Myanmar Foundation has experience in election observation, voter education and other election related issues in Myanmar. Experts from New Myanmar Foundation joined training and conferences in Austria, France, Hong Kong, Malaysia, Ireland, Thailand and different countries and also has experience in Nepal, Bhutan, India, ansBangladesh with the support of the EU, The Asia Foundation, NDI and ANFREL.

NMF published several books, reports and newsletters about training manuals for democracy, voter education, election observation and civil education. NMF has five core trainers and several subordinate trainers, a five member board of directors, three researchers and six full time staff. NMF has legal support from Myanmar Lawyers network and annual audit from respective audit Fund. NMF participates in Myanmar NGO network and work with social activist groups and has support from international organisations such as Norwegian Aids, ANFREL, Asia Foundation and National Democratic Institute.

NMF is currently working on preparing nation-wide election education training and observation processes in the upcoming 2015 Myanmar general elections. NMF is co-ordinating these efforts with peer organisations and international election monitors.

Objectives 
 To encourage civic engagement in political process.
 To build a developed country with "Education".
 To support for developing in morality.

Values 
 All inclusiveness
 Promising Transparency and accountability
 Neutrality & Impartiality

Links 
 http://www.newmyanmarfoundation.org
 http://www.newmyanmarfoundation.blogspot.com/
 https://www.facebook.com/pages/New-Myanmar-Foundation/129141877137552

2008 establishments in Myanmar
Burmese democracy movements
Non-profit organisations based in Myanmar
Organizations established in 2008